3-Amino-9-ethylcarbazole (AEC) is a chemical compound commonly used as a chromogenic substrate in immunohistochemistry, specifically for visualizing sections stained with HRP-conjugated secondary antibodies. After the chromogenic oxidation reaction catalyzed by HRP, a red water-insoluble precipitate is formed in situ, visualizing the location of the antigen detected by the HRP-conjugated antibody. The resulting stained section can be destained by organic solvents in which the red precipitate is soluble.

References

Carbazoles